Jenő Szilágyi (22 October 1910 – 24 January 1992) was a Hungarian long-distance runner. He competed in the men's 5000 metres at the 1936 Summer Olympics.

References

1910 births
1992 deaths
Athletes (track and field) at the 1936 Summer Olympics
Hungarian male long-distance runners
Hungarian male steeplechase runners
Olympic athletes of Hungary
Place of birth missing
20th-century Hungarian people